Fritzsche is a German surname. Like Fritsch, Fritsche and Fritzsch, it is a patronymic derived from Friedrich.

Fritzsche may refer to:

People
 Ronald Alan Fritzsche (born 1945), American ichthyologist
 Carl Julius Fritzsche (1808–1871), German chemist
 Christian Friedrich Fritzsche (1776–1850), German Protestant theologian
 Franz Volkmar Fritzsche (1806–1887), German classical philologist
 Friedrich Wilhelm Fritzsche (1825–1905), German parliamentarian and newspaper editor in the United States
 Gotthard Daniel Fritzsche (1797–1863), Australian theologian
 Hans Fritzsche (1900–1953), senior German Nazi official
 Hellmut Fritzsche (born 1927), German-American physicist
 Immo Fritzsche (1918–1943), German officer in the Luftwaffe
 Otto Fridolin Fritzsche (1812–1896),  German theologian
 Walter Fritzsche (1903–1956), German footballer

Characters
 Andi Fritzsche, a character in the German soap opera Verbotene Liebe

Places
 Fritzsche Army Air Field (closed 1994), a former airport on the site of Marina Municipal Airport

See also
 Variations of the name:
 Fritsch
 Fritsche
 Fritzsch
 Frič, Czechized variation of the name

Surnames from given names